The Intro is the debut EP by Canadian singer/songwriter Ruth B. It was released on November 27, 2015, and was met with generally positive reviews.

Background
Ruth B had initially gained popularity by posting six-second snippets of her singing on Vine; she was encouraged by her fans to write a full-length song, so she wrote "Lost Boy", which ended up being her first hit. The song entered the Top 100 of the iTunes chart "with no promotion", and B began receiving offers for recording contracts from various record labels. She signed to Columbia Records and shortly after began recording music for "The Intro." B stated in an interview with Rookie that being signed "felt really validating and cool that people in the business thought that I could do it, not just my friends and family."

Writing and recording
Ruth B began writing music after being signed to her record label; she stated that she wanted to take an "honest, real, and vulnerable" approach when writing the music. Ruth B self-produced her entire EP, and wrote 14 songs for the EP, selecting 4 to be included on the release. Three of the EP's songs ("Lost Boy", "Golden", and "2 Broke Kids") were written prior to Ruth B's signing to the record label; she wrote "Superficial Love" shortly after being signed. The EP was recorded in two days at a music studio in Brooklyn.

Release
The album was released as an MP3 on 27 November 2015, and re-released on CD in 2016, following the success of "Lost Boy".

Critical reception

Andy Kellman, writing for AllMusic, calls the lyrics "elegant and direct" and concludes that the EP is "all aching love songs that are nonetheless comforting."

Commercial performance

The EP debuted at number 20 on the Billboard Canadian Albums Chart. and number 52 on the US Billboard 200. The Intro also reached number 7 on the Americana/Folk Albums chart.

Track listing
Adapted from AllMusic. All songs written by Ruth B.

Charts

Weekly charts

Year-end charts

References

2015 debut EPs
Columbia Records EPs